Olaf Thörsen (born Carlo Andrea Magnani) is an Italian guitarist and founding member of progressive power metal bands Vision Divine and Labyrinth.

Biography

Despite being well-acquainted with music theory, Olaf Thörsen did not start playing the guitar until the age of 20. Knowing how to read and write music gave him the ability to only focus on guitar techniques.

The first band he formed was Vision in February 1991, which later changed its name to Labyrinth. The line up consisted of him on lead guitar with Frank Andiver (drums), Andrea Bartoletti (bass guitar), Andrea Cantarelli (lead guitar), and Fabio Tordiglione (vocals). In 1994 the band released its first demo entitled Midnight Resistance, and then later got signed ton to release Piece of Mind, No Limits, Return to Heaven Denied and Timeless Crime.

In late 1990s Olaf created what intended to be a solo project at first under the title Vision Divine with his Labyrinth bandmates Mat Stancioiu on drums, Andrew McPauls on keyboards. Also in the line up was Andrea "Tower" Torricini on bass, and his once-Labyrinth-bandmate Fabio Lione on vocals. Vision Divine went on to release a self-titled album and shortly turned from a solo project into a band.

After the releases of Sons of Thunder with Labyrinth and Send Me an Angel with Vision Divine, Olaf decided to leave Labyrinth and focus on Vision Divine in Summer of 2002.

On September 11, 2009 Olaf reunites with Labyrinth and prepares to record a new album, Return to Heaven Denied part II, follower of their successful album from 1998. Vision Divine toured across South America in October 2009. Olaf continues to work with both bands ever since.

Discography

Albums

Labyrinth releases
Midnight Resistance (1994)
Piece of Time (1995)
No Limits (1996)
Return to Heaven Denied (1998)
Timeless Crime (1999)
Sons of Thunder (2000)
Return to Heaven Denied Pt. II: "A Midnight Autumn's Dream" (2010)
Architecture of a God (2017)
Welcome to the Absurd Circus (2021)

Vision Divine releases
Vision Divine (1999)
Send Me an Angel (2002)
Stream of Consciousness (2004)
The Perfect Machine (2005)
The 25th Hour (2007)
9 Degrees West of the Moon (2009)
Destination Set to Nowhere (2012)
When All The Heroes Are Dead (2019)

See also
 Vision Divine
 Labyrinth

External links and references
 Olaf's Official Site
 Vision Divine Official Site
 Vision Divine Official Japanese Site
  Vision Divine at Myspace
 Official Labyrinth Site
 Interview with Olaf in 2006

Italian heavy metal guitarists
Italian male guitarists
Living people
1971 births
Vision Divine members
Labyrinth (band) members
21st-century guitarists
21st-century Italian male musicians